Atherinomorinae is a subfamily of silversides from the family, Atherinidae, the Old World silversides.

Genera
The subfamily contains the following genera:

 Alepidomus C. L. Hubbs, 1944 (monotypic)
 Atherinomorus Fowler, 1903 (11 species) 
 Hypoatherina Schultz, 1948 (15 species) 
 Stenatherina  Schultz, 1948 (monotypic)
 Teramulus J.L.B. Smith, 1965 (2 species)

References

 
Ray-finned fish subfamilies
Atherinidae